Sphegina (Sphegina) keeniana (Williston 1887), the Peg-legged Pufftail, is a fairly common species of syrphid fly observed in Eastern North America. Hoverflies can remain nearly motionless in flight. The adults are also known as flower flies for they are commonly found on flowers, from which they get both energy-giving nectar and protein-rich pollen. Larvae found in accumulations of decaying sap under bark, usually in wet situations such as damp, shaded woodland and in partially submerged wood in streams and pools.

Distribution
Canada, United States.

References

Eristalinae
Insects described in 1887
Diptera of North America
Taxa named by Samuel Wendell Williston